Rutherford Page (April 27, 1887 - January 22, 1912) was an early American aviator who died in an airplane crash. An account of Page's death, with photo of him, can be found in Lawrence Goldstone's 2017 young adult book "Higher, Steeper, Faster: The Daredevils Who Conquered the Skies".

Biography
He was born on April 27, 1887, in Manhattan, New York City. He graduated from Yale University in 1910. He crashed from a height of 75 feet at Dominguez Field in Los Angeles, California on January 22, 1912, at 4:00 in his Curtiss biplane and was dead when extricated from the wreckage.

References

External links
findagrave.com
earlyaviators

1887 births
1912 deaths
American aviators
Aviators killed in aviation accidents or incidents in the United States
Accidental deaths in California
 Yale University alumni